Godzilla: Asian American Arts Network was a New York-based Asian American arts collective and support network established in 1990. Founding members Ken Chu, Bing Lee, Margo Machida, and others established Godzilla in order to facilitate inter-generational and interdisciplinary dialogue and collaboration for Asian American artists and art professionals. The collective provided visibility in local and national exhibitions, developed press outreach strategies, published newsletters, and sponsored symposia on Asian American art. It was disbanded in 2001.

Godzilla's contemporaries included Godzookie, and the Barnstormers.

History 
The original members of Godzilla were Tomie Arai, Ken Chu, Karin Higa, Arlan Huang, Byron Kim, Bing Lee, Colin Lee, Janet Lin, Mei-Lin Liu, Margo Machida, Stephanie Mar, Yong Soon Min, Helen Oji, Eugenie Tsai, Charles Yuen and Garson Yu. Some of Godzilla's members were previously involved in Basement Workshop and Asian American Art Centre. Members decided to name the organization "Godzilla" after Japanese movie monster Godzilla.

The collective organized "slide slams" where hundreds of artists had the opportunity to display their work as well as view other artists' works. Godzilla also published a national newsletter that included member-written opinion pieces, coverage of Asian American art from across the United States, and calls for artwork. Because Godzilla members rejected formally becoming a 501(c)3 organization, rotating volunteer committees coordinated much of its work. The Godzilla logo and newsletters were designed and produced by Charles Yuen. 

Other notable artists and arts professionals who later joined Godzilla include artists Paul Pfeiffer, Zhang Hongtu, Nina Kuo, Allan deSouza, Lynne Yamamoto, and art critic Alice Yang.

Whitney Biennial Protest 
In the spring of 1991, members of Godzilla published a letter highlighting the historic absence of Asian American artists in the Whitney Museum of American Art's Biennials. The collective chose to call attention to this absence in part because of the Whitney Biennial's influence in establishing trends in the American art scene. In response to Godzilla's letter, Whitney Museum director David Ross met with Godzilla members Tsai, Machida, Pfeiffer and others to discuss plans to expand minority representation the Whitney's curatorial staff, which was intended to in turn improve the representation of minority artists in the Whitney's future biennials. Tsai was subsequently appointed as a curator at the Whitney in 1994.

Notable exhibitions 

 Dismantling Invisibility: Asian and Pacific Islander Artists Respond to the AIDS Crisis, 1991, Art in General, New York, New York
 The New World Order III: The Curio Shop, 1993, Artists Space, New York, New York
 Urban Encounters, New Museum, 1998
 Why Asia, 2001

External links
NYU's Fales Library and Special Collections Guide to the Godzilla Asian American Arts Network Archive

References

Asian-American art
American artist groups and collectives
Asian-American organizations
Arts organizations established in 1990
1990 establishments in the United States